Natasha Jane Richardson (11 May 1963 – 18 March 2009) was an English actress. A member of the Redgrave family, Richardson was the daughter of actress Vanessa Redgrave and director/producer Tony Richardson and the granddaughter of Michael Redgrave and Rachel Kempson.

Early in her career, she portrayed Mary Shelley in Ken Russell's Gothic (1986) and Patty Hearst in the eponymous 1988 biopic film directed by Paul Schrader and later received critical acclaim and a Theatre World Award for her Broadway debut in the 1993 revival of Anna Christie. She also appeared in The Handmaid's Tale (1990), Nell (1994), The Parent Trap (1998), Maid in Manhattan (2002), and The White Countess (2005).

For her performance as Sally Bowles in the 1998 Broadway revival of Cabaret, she won the Tony Award for Best Performance by a Leading Actress in a Musical, the Drama Desk Award for Outstanding Actress in a Musical and the Outer Critics Circle Award.

Richardson died in New York City, on 18 March 2009, from an epidural hematoma after a skiing accident in Quebec, Canada.

Early life
Natasha Jane Richardson was born and raised in Marylebone, London on May 11, 1963, a member of the Redgrave family, known as a theatrical and film acting dynasty. She was the daughter of director and producer Tony Richardson and actress Vanessa Redgrave, granddaughter of actors Sir Michael Redgrave and Rachel Kempson, sister of Joely Richardson, half-sister of Carlo Gabriel Nero and Katharine Grimond Hess, niece of actress Lynn Redgrave and actor Corin Redgrave, and cousin of Jemma Redgrave.

Richardson's parents divorced in 1967. The following year, she made her film debut at the age of four in an uncredited role in The Charge of the Light Brigade, directed by her father.

Richardson was educated in London at two private schools, the Lycée Français Charles de Gaulle in South Kensington and St. Paul's Girls' School in Hammersmith, before training at the Central School of Speech and Drama.

Career

Theatre

Richardson began her career in regional theatre at Leeds Playhouse, and in 1984 at the Open Air Theatre in London's Regent's Park, when she appeared in A Midsummer Night's Dream with Ralph Fiennes and Richard E. Grant. Her first professional work in London's West End was in a revival of Anton Chekhov's The Seagull in 1985. This production also featured her mother, Vanessa Redgrave. Soon afterward she starred in a London stage production of High Society, adapted from the Cole Porter film. She made her Broadway debut in 1993, in the title role of Anna Christie, which is where she met future husband Liam Neeson. In 1998, she played the role of Sally Bowles in Sam Mendes' revival of Cabaret on Broadway, for which she won the Tony Award for Best Actress in a Musical. The following year, she returned to Broadway in Closer, for which she was nominated for the Drama Desk Award for Outstanding Featured Actress in a Play, and in 2005 she appeared again with the Roundabout, this time as Blanche DuBois in the revival of Tennessee Williams's A Streetcar Named Desire, opposite John C. Reilly as Stanley Kowalski. In January 2009, two months before her death, Richardson played the role of Desirée in a concert production of Stephen Sondheim's A Little Night Music, with her mother Vanessa Redgrave who played Mme. Armfeldt. At the time of Richardson's death, the pair were preparing to co-star in a Broadway revival of the musical.

Film
In 1984, Richardson made her first credited screen appearance as an art tutor in the James Scott-directed Every Picture Tells A Story, based on the early life of the painter William Scott. She later starred as Mary Shelley in the 1986 film Gothic, a fictionalised account of the author's creation of Frankenstein. The following year she starred with Kenneth Branagh and Colin Firth in A Month in the Country, directed by Pat O'Connor. Director Paul Schrader signed her for the title role in Patty Hearst, his 1988 docudrama about the heiress and her kidnapping. Her performances with Robert Duvall and Faye Dunaway in The Handmaid's Tale and Christopher Walken, Rupert Everett and Helen Mirren in The Comfort of Strangers (directed by Schrader) won her the 1990 Evening Standard British Film Award for Best Actress. In 1991, she appeared in The Favour, the Watch and the Very Big Fish with Bob Hoskins. He later credited her with giving him the best kiss of his life during the film. "She got hold of me and kissed me like I've never been kissed before. I was gobsmacked".

Richardson was named Best Actress at the 1994 Karlovy Vary International Film Festival for Widows' Peak and that same year appeared in Nell with Jodie Foster and future husband Liam Neeson. She appeared in the Disney film remake The Parent Trap in 1998 alongside Dennis Quaid, as Elizabeth James, divorced mother of Lindsay Lohan. Additional film credits include Blow Dry (2001), Chelsea Walls (2001), Waking Up in Reno (2002), Maid in Manhattan (2002), Asylum (2005), which won her a second Evening Standard Award for Best Actress, The White Countess (2005), and Evening (2007). Her last screen appearance was as headmistress of a girls' school in the 2008 comedy Wild Child. During the last week of January 2009, she recorded her offscreen role of the wife of climber George Mallory, who disappeared while climbing Mount Everest during a 1924 expedition, in the 2010 documentary film The Wildest Dream, for which Liam Neeson provided narration. Director Anthony Geffen described listening to the film since her death as "harrowing".

Television
Richardson made her American television debut in a small role in the 1984 miniseries Ellis Island. That same year she made her British television debut in an episode of the BBC series Oxbridge Blues. The following year she appeared as Violet Hunter with Jeremy Brett and David Burke in The Adventures of Sherlock Holmes in the episode entitled "The Copper Beeches". She starred with Judi Dench, Michael Gambon and Kenneth Branagh in a 1987 BBC adaptation of the Henrik Ibsen play Ghosts; with Maggie Smith and Rob Lowe in a 1993 BBC adaptation of Suddenly, Last Summer by Tennessee Williams; as Zelda Fitzgerald in the 1993 television movie Zelda; and Haven (2001) on CBS and The Mastersons of Manhattan (2007) on NBC.

Personal life
Richardson's first marriage was to filmmaker Robert Fox, whom she had met in 1985, during the making of Anton Chekhov's The Seagull; they were married from 1990 to 1992. She married actor Liam Neeson in the summer of 1994 at the home they shared in Millbrook, New York; she had become a naturalised American citizen. Richardson had two sons with Neeson: Micheál (born 1995) and Daniel (born 1996).

She helped raise millions of dollars in the fight against AIDS; her father Tony Richardson had died of AIDS-related causes in 1991. She was also actively involved in AmfAR, becoming a board member in 2006 and participating in many other AIDS charities, including Bailey House, God's Love We Deliver, Mothers' Voices, AIDS Crisis Trust and National AIDS Trust, for which she was an ambassador. She received amfAR's Award of Courage in November 2000.

An avid smoker, although she had reportedly quit smoking, Richardson was an outspoken critic of the ban on smoking in New York City restaurants.

Injury and death
At first, she refused any medical help but complained of a severe headache about two hours after the accident. She was flown to Lenox Hill Hospital in New York City, where she died two days later from an epidural hematoma. Richardson's family issued a statement on the day of her death: "Liam Neeson, his sons, and the entire family are shocked and devastated by the tragic death of their beloved Natasha. They are profoundly grateful for the support, love, and prayers of everyone, and ask for privacy during this very difficult time."

On 19 March 2009, theatre lights were dimmed on Broadway in Manhattan and in the West End of London as a mark of respect for Richardson. The following day, a private viewing was held at the American Irish Historical Society in Manhattan. On 22 March 2009, a private funeral was held at St. Peter's Episcopal Church near Millbrook, New York, close to the family's upstate home. Richardson was buried near her maternal grandmother Rachel Kempson in the churchyard. Richardson's aunt, Lynn Redgrave, was buried in the same churchyard on 8 May 2010, near Richardson and Kempson.

Filmography

Film

Television

Theatre

References

External links

 
 
 
Natasha Richardson – Daily Telegraph obituary

1963 births
2009 deaths
20th-century English actresses
20th-century English singers
20th-century English women singers
21st-century English actresses
Accidental deaths from falls
Accidental deaths in New York (state)
Actresses from London
Alumni of the Royal Central School of Speech and Drama
British expatriate actresses in the United States
Burials in New York (state)
Deaths from epidural hematoma
Deaths from head injury
Drama Desk Award winners
English Roman Catholics
English Shakespearean actresses
English emigrants to the United States
English film actresses
English musical theatre actresses
English stage actresses
English television actresses
HIV/AIDS activists
Naturalized citizens of the United States
People educated at Lycée Français Charles de Gaulle
People educated at St Paul's Girls' School
People from Marylebone
People from Millbrook, New York
Redgrave family
Skiing deaths
Sport deaths in Canada
Theatre World Award winners
Tony Award winners